The Mishawaka Amphitheatre is a single stage outdoor concert venue located approximately  northwest of Fort Collins, Colorado, on Colorado State Highway 14. It is on the banks of the Poudre River. The restaurant is open year-round and the amphitheatre is open from May to September.

Past performers include Buckethead, Bela Fleck & the Flecktones, Israel Vibrations, Medeski, Martin, and Wood, Blackalicious, George Clinton, Sound Tribe Sector Nine, and many others.

It is currently owned by Dani Grant, who bought it in 2010 from Robin Jones. Nevertheless, Jones wanted to sell the venue to "someone who would keep it a musical amphitheatre."

References

Culture of Fort Collins, Colorado
Music venues in Colorado
Buildings and structures in Larimer County, Colorado
Buildings and structures in Fort Collins, Colorado